1-Bromo-3-chloropropane is an organohalogen compound with the formula Br(CH2)3Cl.  It is a colorless liquid, produced by free-radical addition of hydrogen bromide to allyl chloride.  It is used as an alkylating agent to install the –(CH2)3Cl
 and –(CH2)3– groups.  For example, it is a precursor to 4-chlorobutyronitrile.

References

Organochlorides
Organobromides